This is a list of cricketers who have played matches for the Federally Administered Tribal Areas cricket team in Pakistan.

 Aamer Yamin
 Abdul Aziz
 Abdul Rauf
 Adnan Ghaus
 Ahmed Asfandyar
 Ahsan Hafeez
 Asad Afridi
 Asif Afridi
 Asif Ali
 Awais Zia
 Fawad Khan
 Fazal-ur-Rehman
 Hafidullah
 Hasnain Khan
 Hayatullah
 Hussain Talat
 Ibraheem Gul
 Irfanullah Shah
 Khushdil Shah
 Liaqat Ali
 Majid Khan
 Mohammad Naeem
 Mohammad Nisar
 Mohammad Sarwar
 Nabi Gul
 Nisar Afridi
 Nisar Ahmed
 Razaullah Wazir
 Rehan Afridi
 Rehmatullah
 Saad Altaf
 Saddam Afridi
 Saeed Khan
 Sajjad Hussain
 Saleem Burki
 Samar Gul
 Sameen Gul
 Samiullah
 Sohail Akhtar
 Sohrab Khan
 Wilayat Mohammad
 Yasir Hameed
 Zeeshan Khan
 Zulqarnain

References 

Lists of Pakistani cricketers